The 2019 United States Mixed Curling Championship was held from March 24 to 30 in Denver, Colorado.

The winning team earned the right to represent the United States at the 2019 World Mixed Curling Championship in Aberdeen, Scotland.

Teams
Ten teams qualified to participate in the 2019 national championship.

Round-robin results and standings

Tiebreaker

Playoffs 

All draw times are listed in Mountain Time (UTC−7)

Semifinals
March 29, 7:30pm

Bronze-medal game
March 30, 2:00pm

Gold-medal game
March 30, 2:00pm

Final standings

References

External links 
  (web archive)

United States National Curling Championships
Curling in Colorado
Sports competitions in Denver
Curling, United States Mixed
Curling, United States Mixed
Curling, United States Mixed
United States 2019